UK-DMC or UK-DMC 1, also known as BNSCSAT-1, was a British satellite that formed part of the Disaster Monitoring Constellation (DMC). It was built by Surrey Satellite Technology, who operated it via DMC International Imaging on behalf of the British National Space Centre and later the UK Space Agency. It was launched alongside other DMC satellites on 27 September 2003, and retired from service in November 2011.

Mission
As well as carrying remote sensing imaging sensors, the satellite also carries experimental payloads: the CLEO Cisco router in Low Earth Orbit, an experiment demonstrating GNSS reflectometry, and a water resistojet propulsion system. The UK-DMC demonstrated the first use of the Interplanetary Internet in space. In November 2010, nearing the end of its operational life, UK-DMC was placed into a lower orbit.

Deactivation
After 8 years in orbit, daily operations of the satellite ceased in November 2011. Operations have been taken over by the satellite's successor, UK-DMC 2.

The satellite is now a part of the growing space junk in Low Earth Orbit, which will decay in the Earth's atmosphere sometime in the future.

References

External links

 SSTL page describing UK-DMC satellite, retrieved 2 November 2007.

Spacecraft launched in 2003
Space programme of the United Kingdom
Satellites of the United Kingdom